Millais Culpin FRCS (6 January 1874 in Ware, Hertfordshire – 14 September 1952 in St Albans, Hertfordshire) was an English physician and psychotherapist.

He appears as a character in the Casualty 1907 and Casualty 1909 television series, where he was played by Will Houston.

Culpin lived at Meads, Loughton, where he is commemorated by a blue plaque.

Publications 
Mental Abnormality: Facts and Theories (1948)
Psychology in Medicine (1945)
Recent Advances in the Study of Psychoneuroses (1931)
Spiritualism and the New Psychology: An Explanation of Spiritualist Phenomena and Beliefs in Terms of Modern Knowledge (1920)

References

Sources 
 Frances Millais MacKeith, ‘Culpin,  Millais  (1874–1952)’, Oxford Dictionary of National Biography, Oxford University Press,  2004; online edn, Oct 2006 http://www.oxforddnb.com/view/article/51592 accessed  Millais Culpin (1874–1952): 
 CULPIN, Millais’,   Who Was Who,  A & C Black,   1920–2008;     online edn,   Oxford University Press, Dec 2007       accessed 29 Jan 2012
 obituary: 
 http://hopc.bps.org.uk/document-download-area/document-download$.cfm?file_uuid=DB90CC9A-BD85-6D7B-0B27-82B9F9046938&ext=pdf
 Australian Dictionary of Biography http://adb.anu.edu.au/biography/culpin-millais-12872

External links
 
 

1874 births
1952 deaths
Anomalistic psychology
English psychologists
Presidents of the British Psychological Society
Fellows of the Royal College of Surgeons
People from Loughton